Orontius is a name of Latin origin.  It can refer to:

People
Marcellus Orontius, a disciple of Plotinus
Orontius of Lecce, or Oronzo, saint 
Vincent, Orontius, and Victor (d. 305 AD), saints 
Orontius Finnaeus (Oronce Finé) (1494-1555), French cartographer and mathematician

Places
Orontius (crater), on the Moon, named after Orontius Finnaeus

See also
Orontes River
Oronzo (disambiguation)